Negócio da China is a Brazilian telenovela produced and broadcast by Globo. It premiered on 6 October 2008, replacing Ciranda de Pedra, and ended on 13 March 2009, replaced by Paraíso. The series is written by Miguel Falabella, with the collaboration of Mauro Mendonça Filho and Roberto Talma.

It stars Jui Huang, Bruna Marquezine, Anderson Lau, Grazi Massafera, Ricardo Pereira, Rodrigo Mendonça, Thiago Fragoso, Fernanda de Freitas and Juliana Didone.

Plot
In Macau, China, Liu (Jui Huang) stole 1 billion euros from a casino, not knowing it belonged to the Chinese mafia, through a digital transaction in which the data was recorded on a flash drive. Pursued, he flees to Portugal and the device ends up in the suitcase João (Ricardo Pereira), who is moving to Brazil, causing Liu to also have to travel to Brazil to try to recover it. Liu goes to live in Parque das Nações, a suburb of Rio de Janeiro, where he falls in love with the martial arts fighter Flor de Lys (Bruna Marquezine), but the two have to face Wu (Anderson Lau), a Chinese mercenary and Liu's cousin, who also wants the money and put an end to the hacker. In addition, there is also Stelinha (Fernanda Rodrigues), who returns to Brazil after years living in Asia, where she joined another Chinese faction that also wants fortune, in addition to rivaling Flor on the mat.

Meanwhile, João falls in love with Lívia (Grazi Massafera), who struggles to raise her son Théo (Eike Duarte) on her own, the result of a troubled marriage with Heitor (Fábio Assunção), whose mothers Luli (Eliana Rocha) and Suzete (Yoná Magalhães) tormented the two until they separated. After Heitor is murdered for finding out about the flash drive, Lívia starts to live a romance with João, but is also harassed and persecuted by the psychotic Ramiro (Rodrigo Mendonça).

Cast 
 Jui Huang as Liu Chuang
 Bruna Marquezine as Flor de Lys Silvestre
 Grazi Massafera as Lívia Noronha
 Ricardo Pereira as João Viegas
 Anderson Lau as Wu Chuang
 Fernanda Rodrigues as Stela Falcão "Stelinha"
 Rodrigo Mendonça as Ramiro Veláquez
 Thiago Fragoso as Diego Dumas Fontanera
 Fernanda de Freitas as Antonella Bertazzi
 Juliana Didone as Maria Celeste Moreira
 Natália do Vale as Júlia Dumas Fontanera
 Herson Capri as Adriano Fontanera
 Luciana Braga as Denise Dumas
 Oscar Magrini as Mauro Bertazzi
 Vera Zimmermann as Joelma Bertazzi
 Ney Latorraca as Edmar Silvestre
 Leona Cavalli as Maralanis Silvestre
 Yoná Magalhães as Suzete Noronha
 Nathalia Timberg as Augusta Dumas
 Francisco Cuoco as Evandro Fontanera
 Cláudia Jimenez as Violante Gonçalves
 Xuxa Lopes as Abigail 
 Déborah Kalume as Edilza
 Raoni Carneiro as Heraldo Alonso "Heraldinho"
 Dudu Pelizzari as Antônio José Moreira "Tozé"
 Izabella Bicalho as Zuleika
 Eliana Rocha as Luli Maria Alonso
 Joaquim Monchique as Belarmino Moreira
 Carla Andrino as Carminda Moreira
 Bia Nunnes as Matilde Fontanera
 Jandir Ferrari as Alaor
 Luciana Mizutani as Suyan
 Maria Vieira as Aurora Viegas
 Zezeh Barbosa as Semiramís
 Maria Gladys as Lucivone
 Débora Olivieri as Aldira
 Élida Muniz as Natália
 Bruce Gomlevsky as Nereu
 Élida L'Astorina as Vera
 Frederico Reuter as Zé Boneco
 Cláudia Netto as Dalva Falcão
 Sandro Christopher as Odilon Falcão
 Luca de Castro as Donato
 Isaac Bardavid as Homero
 Thelma Reston as Olímpia
 Duse Nacaratti as Tia Saudade
 Nil Neves as Isidoro
 Murilo Grossi as Othon
 Alby Ramos as Avelino
 Renata Vilela as Doctor Myrna
 Eike Duarte as Théo Noronha Alonso
 Amélia Bittencourt as Clarice
 Josie Antello as Lausanne
 Ernesto Xavier as Tamuz Moreira
 Elder Gatelli as Jasão
 Luciana Mivitami as Suy-Na
 Chao Chen as Zedong Yao

Special guest stars 
 Fábio Assunção as Heitor Alonso
 Dalton Vigh as Dr. Otávio Della Riva 
 Antônio Fagundes as Ernesto Dumas Fontanera  
 Sérgio Loroza as Detetive Adílson
 Débora Lamm as Mariete Gonçalves 
 Cacau Hygino as Pedro
 Victor Pecoraro as Felisberto 
 Ellen Rocche as Laura
 Alexandre Zacchia as Zeílson
 Inez Vianna as Dóris
 Bruno Fagundes as Jander 
 Luca de Castro as Donato
 Chico Tenreiro as Juiz de Paz

Soundtrack 

Negócio da China is the soundtrack of the telenovela, released on 13 November 2008 by Som Livre.

References

External links 
 

2008 telenovelas
TV Globo telenovelas
Brazilian telenovelas
2008 Brazilian television series debuts
2009 Brazilian television series endings
2000s Brazilian television series
Martial arts television series
Portuguese-language telenovelas
Television shows set in Rio de Janeiro (city)
Triad (organized crime)